The 2012 National League Wild Card Game was a play-in game during Major League Baseball's (MLB) 2012 postseason played between the National League's (NL) two wild card teams, the St. Louis Cardinals and the Atlanta Braves. It was held at Turner Field in Atlanta, on October 5, 2012, at 1:07 p.m. EDT. The Cardinals won by a 6–3 score and advanced to play the Washington Nationals in the NL Division Series. In addition to being the inaugural NL Wild Card Game, it is notable for being the final game of Chipper Jones's career, as well as for a controversial infield fly rule call made by umpire Sam Holbrook. The game was televised on TBS.

Game results

Line score

The Braves started Kris Medlen, who had a 9–0 win–loss record and 0.97 earned run average (ERA) in 12 games started during the 2012 season.  The Cardinals selected Kyle Lohse, who had a 16–3 win–loss record and 2.86 ERA during the season, as their starting pitcher.

Lohse allowed a two-run home run to David Ross in the second inning. The Cardinals scored three runs in the fourth inning, in which Chipper Jones committed a throwing error, taking a 3–2 lead. Medlen allowed a home run to Matt Holliday in the sixth inning. After the Cardinals scored two more runs in the top of the seventh inning, the Braves scored one in the bottom of the seventh.

In the bottom of the eighth inning, Andrelton Simmons hit a fly ball to left field that dropped in between Cardinals shortstop Pete Kozma and left fielder Holliday. Left field umpire Sam Holbrook called Simmons out, citing the infield fly rule.  Had an infield fly not been called, Simmons would have been credited with a single and Atlanta would have had the bases loaded with one out, trailing 6–3. Fans littered the field with trash, delaying the game for 19 minutes before a message over the Turner Field public address system advised fans the game was subject to forfeiture by the umpires if the field continued to remain unplayable due to the thrown debris. Atlanta manager Fredi González announced that the Braves would play the rest of the game under protest. The protest was denied shortly after the game by Joe Torre, MLB executive vice president for baseball operations, saying it was a judgment call—which cannot be protested under MLB rules. Prior to the game, MLB's official Twitter bio included the joke "We don't understand the infield fly rule either". This was quickly removed in light of the controversial call.

In the bottom of the ninth inning, batting against Cardinals closer Jason Motte, Chipper Jones reached first base on an infield single in his final Major League at-bat. Freddie Freeman hit a ground rule double, bringing Dan Uggla to bat as the potential tying run. Motte retired Uggla with a groundout to record the save, then both teams rushed off the field after fans resumed throwing debris.

Notes

References

External links
 
 

2012 Major League Baseball season
Atlanta Braves postseason
St. Louis Cardinals postseason
2012 in sports in Georgia (U.S. state)
2012 in Atlanta
Major League Baseball Wild Card Game
October 2012 sports events in the United States
Major League Baseball controversies